John Clopton was an American politician.

John Clopton may also refer to:
 John B. Clopton (1789–1860), American politician and jurist from Virginia
John Clopton (died 1424), MP for Gloucester
John Clopton (died 1719), MP for Warwick